O with breve (О̆ о̆; italics: О̆ о̆) is a letter of the Cyrillic script. In all its forms it is a homoglyph of the Latin letter O with breve (Ŏ ŏ Ŏ ŏ). 

O with breve is used in the Itelmen and Khanty languages.

See also
Ŏ ŏ : Latin letter Ŏ - a Silesian letter
Cyrillic characters in Unicode

References

Cyrillic letters with diacritics
Letters with breve